The Arikem languages of Brazil form a branch of the Tupian language family. 

They are Karitiâna and the extinct Kabixiana and Arikem.

Varieties
Below is a list of Arikém language varieties listed by Loukotka (1968), including names of unattested varieties.

Arikém / Uitáte / Ahôpovo / Ariquemes - spoken on the Ariquemes River and Jamari River, Rondônia.
Caritiana - spoken on the Candeias River, Rondônia.

References

Tupian languages